Hedlin is a surname. Notable people with the surname include:
Edie Hedlin (born 1944), American archivist, librarian, and historian
Eric Hedlin (born 1993), Canadian long-distance swimmer